The following lists events that happened during 1988 in the Union of Burma.

Incumbents
Prime Minister: 
 until July 26: Maung Maung Kha 
 July 26-September 18: Tun Tin
 starting September 18: Saw Maung

Events

August
 August 6 - The 1988 Myanmar–India earthquake, an M7.3 earthquake struck near the border with India, killing five.
 August 8 - 8888 Uprising
 Thousands of protestors are killed during anti-government demonstrations.

September
 September 22 - Saw Maung becomes new general of the military junta in Burma and the streets remain quiet.

November
 November 6 - The M7.7 and M7.2 1988 Lancang–Gengma earthquakes strikes near the Myanmar–China border, killing at least 938.

References

 
Years of the 20th century in Myanmar
1980s in Myanmar